Newton is a ward in Sandwell, West Midlands, England.  On the eastern bank of the River Tame, it is currently represented by 3 Labour Party councillors, who sit on the Metropolitan Borough Council.

Newton is part of the West Bromwich East parliament constituency for elections to the House of Commons. The local MP is currently Conservative, Nicola Richards.

References 

Areas of Sandwell
West Bromwich